Dig That Crazy Christmas is the second Christmas album by The Brian Setzer Orchestra. Released in 2005 on Surfdog Records, it is a collection of holiday songs performed in big band swing style. Although most of the songs have been previously recorded by other artists, it includes two originals written by Setzer. This album follows up his 2002 Christmas release, Boogie Woogie Christmas.

Track listing
 "Dig That Crazy Santa Claus" – 2:14 (Albert Johnston Jr., Leon René, Rafael René)
 "Angels We Have Heard on High" – 4:21 (traditional)
 "Gettin' in the Mood (For Christmas)" – 3:34 (Joseph C. Garland, Michael Himmelstein, Brian Setzer)
 "White Christmas" – 5:22 (Irving Berlin)
 "Let It Snow! Let It Snow! Let It Snow!" – 2:08 (Sammy Cahn, Jule Styne)
 "'Zat You Santa Claus?" – 3:13 (Jack Fox)
 "Hey Santa!" – 4:08 (Setzer)
 "My Favorite Things" – 3:59 (Oscar Hammerstein II, Richard Rodgers)
 "You're a Mean One, Mr. Grinch" – 2:38 (Theodor Geisel, Albert Hague)
 "Cool Yule" – 2:35 (Steve Allen, Eric Kornfeld)
 "Jingle Bell Rock" – 2:36 (Joe Beal, Jim Boothe)
 "Santa Drives a Hot Rod" – 4:05 (Setzer)
 "What Are You Doing New Year's Eve" – 3:33 (Frank Loesser)

Personnel
Brian Setzer - guitar, vocals
Chris Lord-Alge - mixing
John Holbrook - mixing
Julie Reiten - vocals
Mark Anthony Jones - arranger
Kevin Norton - rap
Nola Schoder - production co-ordination

Notes 

The Brian Setzer Orchestra albums
2005 Christmas albums
Albums produced by Dave Darling
Christmas albums by American artists
Dig That Crazy Santa Claus
Surfdog Records albums
Swing Christmas albums